The 2018 Sparks Energy 300 was the ninth stock car race of the 2018 NASCAR Xfinity Series season, and the 27th iteration of the event. The race was held on Saturday, April 28, 2018, in Lincoln, Alabama at Talladega Superspeedway, a 2.66 miles (4.28 km) permanent triangle-shaped superspeedway. The race was extended from the scheduled 113 laps to 115 due to a NASCAR overtime finish. At race's end, Spencer Gallagher of GMS Racing would make a last lap pass on Tyler Reddick and fend off the field to win a shocker, winning his first and so far final NASCAR Xfinity Series win of his career and his first and only win of the season. To fill out the podium, Brandon Jones of Joe Gibbs Racing and Justin Allgaier of JR Motorsports would finish second and third, respectively.

Background 

Talladega Superspeedway, originally known as Alabama International Motor Superspeedway (AIMS), is a motorsports complex located north of Talladega, Alabama. It is located on the former Anniston Air Force Base in the small city of Lincoln. The track is a tri-oval and was constructed in the 1960s by the International Speedway Corporation, a business controlled by the France family. Talladega is most known for its steep banking and the unique location of the start/finish line that's located just past the exit to pit road. The track currently hosts the NASCAR series such as the NASCAR Cup Series, Xfinity Series and the Camping World Truck Series. Talladega is the longest NASCAR oval with a length of 2.66-mile-long (4.28 km) tri-oval like the Daytona International Speedway, which also is a 2.5-mile-long (4 km) tri-oval.

Entry list

Practice

First practice 
The first practice session would occur on Friday, April 27, at 10:35 AM EST, and would last for 50 minutes.

Second and final practice 
The second and final practice session, sometimes referred to as Happy Hour, would occur on Friday, April 27, at 12:35 PM EST, and would last for 50 minutes.

Qualifying 
Qualifying would occur on Saturday, April 28, at 10:00 AM EST. Since Talladega Superspeedway at least , the qualifying system was a single car, single lap, two round system where in the first round, everyone would set a time to determine positions 13-40. Then, the fastest 12 qualifiers would move on to the second round to determine positions 1-12.

One driver would fail to qualify: Morgan Shepherd.

Race results 
Stage 1 Laps: 25

Stage 2 Laps: 25

Stage 3 Laps: 65

References 

2018 NASCAR Xfinity Series
NASCAR races at Talladega Superspeedway
April 2018 sports events in the United States
2018 in sports in Alabama